Niiko is a type of dance indigenous to Southern Somalia. Due to its sensual nature it is more often done by non-practicing Muslims and eschewed by those who are religiously observant, especially in freemixed gatherings. It involves moving the hips and is similar to twerking except the hips are moved in a rotary fashion. Niiko is often performed whilst wearing a dirac as well as a scarf around the waist in order to accentuate the buttocks, this dance is practiced by both Southern ethnic Somalis though originally introduced by Somali Bantus.

References

External link
Youtube video

Somali culture
African dances